1941 Egypt Cup Final, was the final match of 1940–41 Egypt Cup, when El-Mokhtalat (Zamalek SC now) defeated Cairo Police by a score of 5–0, El-Mokhtalat claimed the cup for the 5th time.

Route to the final

Game description

Match details

References

External links
 www.angelfire.com/ak/EgyptianSports/ZamalekInEgyptCup.html#1941

1941
EC 1941
EC 1941